Haar Jeet is a 1972 Hindi-language drama film directed by C.P. Dixit. The film stars Rehana Sultan and Anil Dhawan. The film was a remake of Tamil film Thamarai Nenjam.

Cast 
Rehana Sultan ... Kamal
Radha Saluja ... Radha
Anil Dhawan ... Ashok Gupta
Mehmood ... Narayan
Madan Puri ... Madhusudan Gupta (Ashok's Elder Brother)
Dhumal ... Radha's Father
Sarika
Master Chintu
Bhola
Jal Khatau
Narendra Kumar
Kamini Kaushal

Plot

Soundtrack

References

External links 
 

1972 films
1970s Hindi-language films
1972 drama films
Films scored by Laxmikant–Pyarelal
Films with screenplays by K. Balachander
Hindi remakes of Tamil films